The Kūnaṛ River, also known in its upper reaches as the Mastuj, Chitral, or Kama River, is about  long, located in eastern Afghanistan (Nuristan, Kunar, Nangarhar) and northern Pakistan (Khyber Pakhtunkhwa). It emerges just south of the Broghil Pass, in the upper part of Chitral District of Khyber Pakhtunkhwa near the Afghan border. The river system is fed by melting glaciers and snow of the Hindu Kush mountains. The Kunar River is a tributary of the Kabul River, which is in turn a tributary of the Indus River.

Origin and course of flow
The river rises in the far north glaciated Hindu Kush mountains of Chitral, Khyber Pakhtunkhwa, Pakistan.  Downstream as far as the town of Mastuj it is known as the "Mastuj River" from there to its confluence with the Lotkoh River just north of the important regional centre of Chitral.  It is then called the "Chitral River", before flowing south into the upper Kunar Valley of Afghanistan. 
At the confluence in Asadabad, historically Chaga Sarai, it meets with Pech River and finally empties into the Kabul River just to the east of the city of Jalalabad in Afghanistan. The combined rivers then flow eastwards into Pakistan again, roughly following the Grand Trunk Road through the Khyber Pass, and joining the Indus River at the city of Attock.

History
Before the political division of the area divided the Kunar and Chitral Valley between the modern nation states of Afghanistan and Pakistan, it had formed an important trade route, being the easiest way to travel from the Pamir Mountains' passes to the plains of the Indian subcontinent.  While navigable in parts by expert kayakers, etc..., it is more precise to say its valley forms a trade route since, like nearly all of the rivers in Africa and Asia, it is not navigable for commerce or transport.
"At about six miles from Jellalabad, we quitted the valley of the Cabul river, and entered that of the Kama or Kooner river. I have not seen so fine a valley as this anywhere. The Kama is a large rapid stream, with about a mile of rich soil on either side, sometimes considerably more. The villages are large and well peopled." - Major - General Augustus Abbott, mid 19th century

See also
Konar Dam
Chitral
Kunar Province

References

Further reading 
 

Rivers of Afghanistan
Rivers of Khyber Pakhtunkhwa
Kabul River
Landforms of Nuristan Province
Landforms of Kunar Province
Landforms of Nangarhar Province
Chitral
Chitral District
International rivers of Asia
Rivers of Pakistan